Metteniusa edulis is a species of flowering plants in the family Metteniusaceae. It was formerly placed in the family Cardiopteridaceae. It is endemic to Colombia.

References

Metteniusaceae
Endemic flora of Colombia
Vulnerable plants
Taxonomy articles created by Polbot